The 2020–21 Ligue 1 season, also known as Ligue 1 Uber Eats for sponsorship reasons, was a French association football tournament within Ligue 1. It was the 83rd season since its establishment. The season started on 21 August 2020 and ended on 23 May 2021. The league fixtures were announced on 9 July 2020.

Paris Saint-Germain were the three-time defending champions, after they were awarded the title for the previous season following the league's cancellation due to the COVID-19 pandemic.

Following a 2–1 win against Angers on the final day of the season, Lille secured a fourth French league title, and their first since 2011.

Teams

Changes
Lorient and Lens were promoted from the 2019–20 Ligue 2. After the French court had initially ruled that the season would proceed with 22 teams, the relegation of Amiens and Toulouse to the 2020–21 Ligue 2 was confirmed on 23 June 2020, following a vote by the LFP.

Stadiums and locations

Number of teams by regions

Personnel and kits

Managerial changes

League table
Following the discontinuation of the Coupe de la Ligue at the end of the 2019–20 season, its European qualification place was given to the team finishing fifth in Ligue 1.

Results

Relegation play-offs
The 2020–21 season ended with a relegation play-off between the 18th-placed Ligue 1 team, Nantes, and the winner of the semi-final of the Ligue 2 play-off, Toulouse, on a two-legged confrontation.

1st leg

2nd leg

2–2 on aggregate. Nantes won on away goals and therefore both clubs remained in their respective leagues.

Season statistics

Top goalscorers

Clean sheets

Hat-tricks

Scoring
First goal of the season:  Ismaël Traoré for Angers against Dijon
Last goal of the season:  Arkadiusz Milik for Marseille against Metz

Discipline

Player
 Most yellow cards: 14
 Álvaro (Marseille)
 Most red cards: 3
 Moreto Cassamá (Reims)

Team
 Most yellow cards: 94
Marseille
 Most red cards: 10
Lyon
 Fewest yellow cards: 56
Strasbourg
 Fewest red cards: 2
Angers
Lille
Saint-Étienne

Awards

Monthly

Annual

References

External links

 

Ligue 1 seasons
1
France